Homosexuality in Zoroastrianism is, as in many other religions, a controversial topic with differing consensus over time.

Homosexuality in scripture
The most sacred scripture of Zoroastrianism is called the Avesta. The oldest portion of the Avesta are the writings of Zarathustra himself and called the Gathas. The Gathas do not explicitly condemn homosexual acts, although the Südgar Nask commentary on the Gathas dislikes sodomy.

Traditionalist Zoroastrians believe that the Vendidad, one of the books of the Avesta, is an inherent part of Zoroastrian oral tradition even though it was compiled far later than the other parts of the Avesta.

This passage has been interpreted to mean that homosexuality is a form of demon worship, and thus sinful. Ancient commentary on this passage suggests that those engaging in sodomy could be killed without permission from the Dastur, the high priest.

Zoroastrianism has been said to have a "hatred of male anal intercourse" that is reflected in at least one mythological tale. When Ahriman, the "Spirit of Aridity and Death" and "Lord of Lies", sought to destroy the world, he engaged in self-sodomy. That caused an "explosion of evil power" and resulted in the birth of a host of evil minions.

Apart from the Vendidad, the Pahlavi scriptures, later religious Persian books considered sacred by many Zoroastrians, also strongly forbid sodomy.

References

Further reading

External links
 AVESTA: Vendidad: FARGARD 8. Funerals and purification, unlawful sex
 religioustolerance.org – The Zoroastrian Faith and Homosexuality
 Iranica.com – Homosexuality

LGBT and religion
Sexual Orientation
LGBT in Iran